Judge vs. Judge is a 2017 South Korean television series starring Park Eun-bin, Yeon Woo-jin, Dong Ha and Na Hae-ryung. It aired from November 22, 2017 to January 11, 2018 on SBS TV's Wednesdays and Thursdays at 22:00 (KST) time slot for 32 episodes.

Synopsis
The story of a fiery judge Lee Jung-joo (Park Eun-bin) who fights to reveal innocence of her older brother who was framed for rape and murder and got killed while trying to acquit himself.

Cast

Main
 Park Eun-bin as Lee Jung-joo/Choi Jung-joo, a hot-tempered judge who is incapable of holding her emotions to vent shameless defendants with unspeakable words. She presides at the Seoul District Court.
 Yeon Woo-jin as Sa Eui-hyeon, a righteous independent judge who is excellent in his use of law and ethics to reach judgement. He is assigned to the same division as Lee Jung-joo.
 Dong Ha as Do Han-joon, a prosecutor who graduated with Sa Eui-hyeon at the top of his class.
 Na Hae-ryeong as Jin Se-ra, an intelligent third generation chaebol who is a law school student and a former idol singer.

Supporting

People at Korea University Law School
 Heo Joon-seok as Ha Young-hoon, a former prison guard and law school student who is responsible for creating the misjudgment research team.
 Jung Yoo-min as Hwang Min-ah, a former Blue House bodyguard and current law school student.
 Hong Seung-beom as Nam Yoon-il
 Jung Yeon-joo as Lee Seon-hwa, a single mother who is a member of the misjudgment researching team.

People at court
 Lee Moon-sik as Oh Ji-rak, a chief prosecuting attorney.
 Lee Chang-wook as Jeong Chae-sung
 Woo Hyun as Choi Go-soo
 Bae Hae-sun as Moon Yoo-seon
 Cho Jae-ryong as Song Ho-chan
 Kim Min-sang as Seo Dae-su
 Lee Hye-eun as Oh Mi-ja
 Heo Jung-gyu as Kim Moo-sik
 Kim Jin-yeop as Lee Cha-won
 Oh Na-ra as Judge Yoon

Extended
 Kim Hae-sook as Yoo Myung-hee, a professor in law school. She inspired Lee Jung-joo to become a judge.
 Lee Deok-hwa as Do Jin-myung
 Choi Jung-woo as Sa Jeong-do
 Park Ji-a as Jang Soon-bok
 Seo Cho-won as Supporting
 Ji Seung-hyun as Choi Kyung-ho, Lee Jung-joo's older brother
 Kim Hee-jung as Eom Sin-sook, Lee Jung-joo's mother and a janitor at the courthouse.

Production
The first script reading of the cast was held on October 23, 2017 at SBS Ilsan Production Center.

Ratings

Awards and nominations

References

External links
  
 
 

Seoul Broadcasting System television dramas
Korean-language television shows
2017 South Korean television series debuts
2018 South Korean television series endings
South Korean legal television series